Hot Doc is a Greek news magazine, launched in April 2012 by its owner and editor Kostas Vaxevanis. It is issued every fifteen days.

In October 2012, it published a special issue containing a list of names claimed to be the contents of the Lagarde list. On 28 October 2012, Vaxevanis was arrested in relation to its publication. Vaxevanis' trial began on 1 November and ended the same day with an acquittal.

Since November 2016, Hot Doc has been sold as a supplement of the Documento newspaper, also owned by Vaxevanis.

References

External links
 Official website

2012 establishments in Greece
Biweekly magazines
Magazines published in Greece
Greek-language magazines
Magazines established in 2012
News magazines published in Europe